The Third Narayan Dutt Tiwari ministry is the Council of Ministers in 9th Uttar Pradesh Legislative Assembly headed by Chief Minister Narayan Dutt Tiwari.

Chief Minister & Cabinet Ministers 
 Narayan Dutt Tiwari - Chief Minister
 Vir Bahadur Singh - Irrigation 
 Lokpati Tripathi - Public Health and Medical
 Vasudev Singh - Food and Logistics
 Baldev Singh Arya - Revenue
 Saeedul Hasan - Labour
 Narendra Singh - Agriculture
 Ajeet Pratap Singh - Excise and Prohibition
 Swaroop kumari Bakshi - Social Welfare
 Sunil Shastri - Energy
 Sanjay Singh - Transport
 Ram Ratan Singh - Parliamentary Affairs
 Gopinath Dikshit - Industries
 Shyam Surat Upadhyay - Rural Development and Panchayati Raj
 Beni Bai - Animal Husbandary
 Arun Kumar Singh - Cooperatives
 Raghuvir Singh Yadav - Prison and political Pension
 Sibte Razi - Education and Muslim Waqf
 Jairam Verma - Planning

Minister of State 
 Gulab Singh - Hill Development
 Praveen kumar Sharma - Public Construction
 Shiv Balak Pasi - Agriculture
 Zafar Ali Naqvi - Forest
 Surendra Singh - Rural Development and Panchayati Raj
 Om Prakash Richhariya - Finance and Planning
 Daljit Singh - Animal Husbandry, Dairying and Fisheries 
 Indrajeet - Social Welfare 
 Gauri Shankar - Revenue
 Deepak Kumar - Cooperative
 Padma Seth -Urban Development
 Bhola Shankar Maurya - Irrigation
 Manpal Singh - Food and Logistics
 Mohammad Safiur Rehman Ansari - Industries
 Sankatha Prasad Shastri - Education
 Sukhda Mishra - Energy
 Surendra Singh Chauhan - Justice 
 Hukum Singh - Parliamentary Affairs and information

References

Narayan III
Indian National Congress
1985 establishments in Uttar Pradesh
Cabinets established in 1985